Good Night Show - King Maker is a 2018 Hong Kong survival reality show on ViuTV as first season of , accepting only male contestants. It aired from 15 July to 14 October 2018, with Keung To being the champion, Ian Chan being the first runner-up, and  being the second runner-up.

Two boy groups, namely Mirror and Error, were formed after the competition.

References

External links

2010s Hong Kong television series
2018 in Hong Kong television
Cantonese-language television shows
Reality music competition television series